Elijah Akpan Okon was born in 1913. He was part of a royal family with a line of leaders and chiefs in Ikot Mbon Ikono, Uyo, in the present Akwa Ibom State of Nigeria. His father, Chief Nsentip Ekown, a prominent ruler of Ikono and the suburbs, named him Ukpong Nsentip Ekown. 

When he became old enough to attend school, there were no schools in the whole of Uyo division, and it was difficult to establish any, because of strong opposition by Ibibio people, in and around Uyo. Prior to his birth, his father, Chief Nsentip Ekown had signed a treaty with the British Consul – Sir Robert Brooks which established Uyo as a British Colonial Administrative station. Chief Nsentip Ekown was a Paramount Ruler amongst his people. He was thus confirmed, honored, with this title, and crowned as the first Warrant Paramount Ruler of the area through the Consul by King Edward VII in 1902. Chief Nsentip Ekown, in conjunction with Chief Udo-Ekong Umana Ekam of Abak, led the British to establish the Government School at Abak. As a Warrant Ruler, Chief Nsentip Ekown played a prominent role by assisting the British to subdue Essien Inyang Ide of Abak whose parcel of land the school was established.  It would be quite unsafe for anybody linked with the name Nsentip to attend the school; hence Ukpong Nsentip Ekown had to adopt the name Elijah Akpan Okon to acquire education at the Abak Government School. This was also an era, which the early missionaries and the colonial teachers in Nigeria preferred to, and renamed the Nigerian students with biblical and European names other than African.

In 1940, Chief Elijah Akpan Okon studied Rural Science Education, and community development at Umuahia. He also had a Graduation Certificate in Agriculture and Home Economics in 1947, through the Pennsylvania State College, USA. In 1952 he obtained a Diploma in Business Management and company Secretarial studies from a school in London.

After completing his Primary school education in 1929, he took a job as a teacher in a local school, primarily to have the opportunity of encouraging the people to send their children to school. From 1937–1950, he was a teacher, and Head Master at Ukana Methodist School in Ikot Ekpene. Between 1942 and 1949 Chief Elijah Akpan Okon was the secretary, Nigerian Union of Teachers (N.U.T.) Ikot Ekpene Branch.

His passion as a community leader and organizer showed up early in his life.  Around 1933–1939, Chief Elijah Akpan Okon founded  Ikono Young-men Meeting whose aim was to raise funds and sponsor the youths of that era to have secondary education from the few colleges such as Government College, Umuahia; Etinan Institute, Methodist Boys' High School, Oron and Uzuakoli etc.  Several youths of Ikono availed themselves of that opportunity.

In 1950, he returned from Ukana, Ikot Ekpene to his village Ikot Mbon Ikono, Uyo.  He was appointed a rural science teacher in the Uyo Federated schools (1951–1955).  He left that post, and brought up his village school Ikono Central School (now the AME Zion Mission School) where he was a teacher and the Head Master from (1956–1960).

Within 1949, he had attempted, in vain, to form the Ikono Federation but in the process Northern Ikono Federation emerged in 1950. During his tenure as the founder and first President of the Northern Ikono Federation, a community Centre was built which housed a meeting hall, a library, a postal agency, etc.  Arrangements were made for the local people to learn weaving, and pottery at the center.  In its entirety, the aim of the federation was to raise funds and give scholarships for the local youths to attain higher education.  Sir Clement Pleass, K.C.M.G; K.B.E the British Governor of Eastern Nigeria was invited and he did the inaugural opening of the center on June 29, 1955. Chief Elijah Akpan Okon was given a Certificate of Faithful Service to the people of Uyo, by the Governor.

Chief Elijah Akpan Okon used his political influence and affiliations to establish; and promoted the Primary Education (U P E) programme in Uyo, and the whole of Calabar Province. He set up oil palm seedling nurseries in schools and some communities. He encouraged the local farmers to participate in oil palm (Elaeis guineensis) cultivation' which was a major foreign exchange earner for Nigeria. He ensured that certain farm equipment and fertilizer were distributed free to the local farmers. These exercises were, in part, the programs of the NCNC led government of Eastern Nigeria, which he intended the local farmers to benefit.

From 1959–1961, he became the Chairman of Uyo Federated County Council.  He came up with the first master plan for Uyo. It was at this time that the old stadium, the Uyo Motor Park, the streets were established, and named.  Pipe borne water and electricity were introduced. He made sure that dispensaries/clinics and maternities were built and operated in the rural areas of Uyo Division. Postal agencies were available for people in the local areas. Within this time he excised the Uyo Council into two distinct and separate administrative entities, Uyo Urban; and Uyo Federated County Councils with headquarters at Uyo and Ikot Ebio, Offot respectively. The aim in this was to allow development to expand into the rural areas. He awarded scholarships to qualified and deserving students to colleges and universities. His efforts in all these had yielded a multiplier effect in terms of human power and resource development to the community. Uyo Division now has numerous indigenous and enviable personnel in almost every field of human endeavors.

Chief Elijah Akpan Okon was a Nationalist. His Political Party, National Council of Nigerian Citizens (NCNC), produced Chief (Dr.) Nnamdi Azikiwe as the first indigenous President of Nigeria, who took over the realms of political powers peacefully, from the British Colonial rule, and ushered in a parliamentary democratic system of government. From thence, Nigeria became an independent and a sovereign nation on October 1, 1960. Chief Elijah Akpan Okon held a strong belief and advocated that Ibibio people should participate, and play the politics of the government at the center and to stay within that center and struggle for their rights, and amenities.  This was his main differential point between his political opponents, who stayed or crossed the carpet, from the National Council of Nigerian Citizens (NCNC) to the Action Group (AG) and derived no benefits from that opposing party.

Chief Elijah Akpan Okon was a devout Christian and a Director of Christian education in AME Zion church Nigeria Conference. He was instrumental in establishing the AME Zion mission co-educational Teachers Training College at Ndon Ebom near Uyo. In 1964 he hosted the AME Zion conference at Ikot Mbon Ikono, Uyo. The Presiding Bishop at this conference was Bishop Alfred G. Dunston an African American prelate in charge of the West African Episcopal District of AME Zion mission. In that conference, Chief Elijah Akpan Okon along with others succeeded for the church to sponsor four Nigerians to study in the United States of America. This was a prelude to have Nigerian indigence in the administration of the church. As a result of that initiative, and amongst the four emerged on August 5, 1988 Dr. Samuel Chuka Ekemam, SR, who was consecrated, a BISHOP, and now presides over the affairs of the AME Zion Church in Nigeria Episcopal District and remains the most senior Prelate in AME Zion Church Connection worldwide.

The crisis in Nigeria reached its climax in 1966.  Party politics and the Nigerian Constitution were suspended by the Military take over of the country.  Since he was the chairman of his party (NCNC) for Uyo, he handed all the political papers, other documents, etc. to the Divisional Police officer in Uyo in 1966.  He thus lost interest in active politics.  He decided to pay more attention to his new role as the General Manager of the AME Zion schools in Nigeria, a post he held from 1962–1968.

In 1966 and 1967, the Military Governor of Eastern Nigeria, Lt. Colonel Chukwuemeka Odumegwu Ojukwu appointed him a member of the Eastern Nigeria Consultative Assembly at Enugu as well as a member of the Provincial Executive Committee of Uyo and later on elected as the Sole Administrator for Uyo. He had no choice but to accept, these positions, much against his will. These were the official posts he held, until his mishap.

During the Nigerian Civil War, Chief Elijah Akpan Okon conducted several town hall meetings in a relentless effort to educate the populace on the best ways to comport themselves by words and by deeds to ward off any confrontation by the Biafran soldiers who were under orders to arrest or kill any saboteur. A lot of people had for safety abandoned the big cities for their villages. Chief Elijah Akpan Okon utilized this excess manpower in opening up, and widening their different community roads, which are still being used today. He encouraged the people to show interest in improving their community. Common salt was scarce at this time, and chief Elijah Akpan Okon distributed this essential commodity, free of charge to people.

Somewhere, around January 1968, the Nigerian army had captured Uyo; and the prevailing latent undertone of anarchy gave rise to angry uprising, thuggery, and looting. Significant and irreversible episodes had reached a perilous magnitude, and surpassed a point of no return. Within that community thugs and angry mob moved in, disdaining any obstruction on their path, until they reached, and carried out the object of their mission being utter looting, and burning to ashes the spacious and well accommodating  GOODWILL LODGE  compounds of Chief Elijah Akpan Okon, and other relations. They moved on, vandalized, and looted all they could take away from the Northern Ikono Community Center Building. Okuku Tom Akpan Okon alias Udom Nsentip, a senior brother to Chief Elijah Akpan Okon; and others were detained by the Nigerian army.

These excessive, oppressive and distressing news prompted Chief  Elijah Akpan Okon to turn himself over to the Nigerian soldiers, mainly, in an effort to rescue and gain freedom to those detainees. Chief Elijah Akpan Okon was courageous throughout the ordeal. He sent a letter to the Nigerian Army, commanding officer Uyo specifically stating that he was waiting for them at Northern Ikono Federation center premises. Chief Elijah Akpan Okon was taken to Uyo where he was detained, molested, and eventfully executed, publicly by firing squad, perpetuated by his political opponents, without questions or any form of trial on May 27, 1968 under the orders of Commander Benjamin Adekunle, the Commanding Officer of the Nigerian Army for Uyo. His remains were covered up in a shallow dug up a pit, a spot, which now is the present site of magnificent Ibom Connection in Uyo.

Sources 
 Chief Elijah Akpan Okon – Personal memoirs of 1968
 Okuku Tom Akpan Okon – personal communication, and a letter of 1991
 Northern Ikono Federation Handbook -1955 issue

Nigerian traditional rulers
People from Uyo
1913 births
1968 deaths